Paul Bernard, Psychiatrist is a Canadian dramatic television series which aired on CBC Television from 1971 to 1972.

Premise
Each episode portrayed a patient's appointment with psychiatrist Paul Bernard (Chris Wiggins) at his office. The patient, typically female, would lie on the doctor's couch and reveal her thoughts in keeping with the practices of psychoanalysis. Patients often reappeared on the series for approximately monthly follow-up visits. Script material was derived from Canadian Mental Health Association patient histories.

Production
The series was produced by Michael Spivak (Science International) as a joint effort of his Jaylar Productions and Fremantle International for broadcast on CBC. Two pilot episodes were created prior to the full 130-episode production. Since the plot was limited to the doctor-patient dialogue within Bernard's office, the series was described as a "one-set semi-soap".

Cast
Besides Wiggins, the following actors were cast as patients during the series run:

 Josphine Barrington
 Anna Cameron
 Marcia Diamond
 Nuala Fitzgerald
 Gale Garnett
 Dawn Greenhalgh
 Til Hanson
 Kay Hawtrey
 Valerie Jean Hume
 Barbara Kyle
 Carole Lazare
 Peggy Mahon
 Phyllis Marshall
 Paisley Maxwell
 Arlene Meadows
 Micki Moore
 Michele Oricoine
 Diane Polley
 Vivian Reis
 Shelley Sommers
 Tudi Wiggins

Scheduling
This half-hour series was broadcast on CBC weekdays at 4:00 p.m. (Eastern) from 13 September 1971 to 14 January 1972. The series moved to the 2:00 p.m. time slot from 17 January to 29 November 1972.

The series was also purchased for broadcast in Australia, Hong Kong and the United States (selected CBS stations).

References

External links
 
 

CBC Television original programming
1971 Canadian television series debuts
1972 Canadian television series endings